Mahnian (also Romanized as Māhnīān and Mahnīyan; also known as Māhīān, Mānīān, Mānīyān, and Manīyāu) is a village in Kharqan Rural District, in the Central District of Razan County, Hamadan Province, Iran. At the 2006 census, its population was 480, in 116 families.

References 

Populated places in Razan County